In the 2014–15 AEK B.C. season, AEK returned to the top-tier level Greek Basket League, after an absence in the league of three years. 

During the season, the team didn't begin well, and had to make changes to its initial roster. After a few weeks, Dragan Šakota took over as the team's new head coach, and notable new players came to AEK, such as Pops Mensah-Bonsu, Malik Hairston, and others. Another important change of the club for the season, was the change of the club's owner. Makis Angelopoulos became the club's new owner. At the end of the season, AEK finished in 5th place in the Greek Basket League's regular season, and was defeated by Aris in the Greek Basket League's playoffs.

Transfers 2014-2015

In

Out

Competitions

Overall

Overview

Results summary

Results by round

Greek League

League table

Regular season

Results overview

Quarterfinals

Greek Cup

Playoffs Qualification
Source:  ESAKE

References

External links
Official website
AEK B.C. at ESAKE.gr

2014–15 
2014–15 in Greek basketball by club